Robert Murray McDowall (21 November 1821 – 5 November 1894), was a Scottish-born Australian cricketer who played two first-class cricket matches for Tasmania.  He was born in Edinburgh, Scotland.

He has the distinction of having played in the first ever first-class cricket match in Australia.  When McDowall bowled Duncan Cooper for 4 in Victoria's first innings, he took the first-ever first-class wicket claimed in Australia. McDowall went on to take 5/27 in the first innings, making him the first man to take a 5 wicket haul in Australian first class cricket history.

See also
 List of Tasmanian representative cricketers

External links
Cricinfo Profile

1821 births
1894 deaths
Cricketers from Edinburgh
Australian cricketers
Tasmania cricketers
Scottish emigrants to Australia